The 2010–11 CONCACAF Champions League was the 3rd edition of the CONCACAF Champions League under its current format, and overall the 46th edition of the premier football club competition organized by CONCACAF, the regional governing body of North America, Central America and the Caribbean. The tournament began on July 27, 2010 and ended on April 27, 2011. Monterrey of Mexico won their first title, defeating Real Salt Lake of the United States 3-2 on aggregate in the final. As winners, Monterrey qualified for the 2011 FIFA Club World Cup as the CONCACAF representative.

Qualification

Twenty-four teams participated in the 2010–11 CONCACAF Champions League from the North American, Central American, and Caribbean zones. Nine of the teams came from North America, twelve from Central America, and three from the Caribbean.

Teams may be disqualified and replaced if they do not have a stadium for the tournament that CONCACAF deems suitable. If a club fails to meet the standards for its home stadium, this club must find a suitable stadium in its own country. If said club fails to provide the adequate facilities, it runs the risk of being replaced.

Central America: 12 Central American clubs can qualify to the Champions League. If one or more clubs is precluded, it is supplanted by a club from another Central American federation. The reallocation would be based on results from the 2009–10 CONCACAF Champions League.
Caribbean: If any Caribbean club is precluded, it is supplanted by the "2010 CFU Club Championship" 4th-place finisher.

For the Central American representatives that qualify via split seasons, in nations that play a playoff to determine a national champion, the winner gains the nation's top spot, and in nations that do not, total points over both seasons, followed by other tiebreakers, determine which team gains the nation's top spot.

After having analyzed previous results, the CONCACAF Executive Committee approved a reallocation of berths compared to the previous two seasons, giving Panama one automatic place in the Group Stage while making both of El Salvador's qualifiers go through the preliminary round.

Teams
Teams in bold qualify directly for the Group Stage.

1 Berths originally awarded to Belize (Belize Defence Force) and Nicaragua (Real Estelí), but both countries failed CONCACAF stadium requirements, so the spots vacated were awarded to Honduras (Motagua) and Panama (San Francisco) based on the performances of clubs from those countries last season.

Format
Like the previous editions, the tournament featured a two-legged Preliminary Round for 16 clubs. The eight winners of the aggregate series qualified along with the eight seeded teams that earned a direct spot to enter the Group Stage. The clubs involved in Group Stage were placed into four groups of four with each team playing the others in its group in both home and away matches in a round-robin format. The top two teams from each group advanced to the Quarterfinals of the Championship Round, which consisted of two-legged, home and away, knockout fixtures. For the two-legged ties, the away goals rule would be used, but not after a tie enters extra time, and so a tie would be decided by penalty shootout if the aggregate score is level after extra time.

Teams from the same association (excluding "wildcard" teams which replace a team from another association) may not be drawn with each other in the preliminary round and Group Stage, but may be drawn with each other in the Championship Round, where the only restriction is that in the quarterfinals, a group winner was drawn with the runner-up of another group and hosted the second leg.

Schedule

Preliminary round

The draw for the preliminary round and the Group Stage was held on May 19, 2010, at the CONCACAF headquarters in New York City. The first legs of the preliminary round were played July 27–29, 2010, while the second legs were played August 3–5, 2010.

|}

Group stage

The Group Stage was played in 6 rounds during August–October 2010. The rounds are August 17–19, August 24–26, September 14–16, September 21–23, September 28–30, and October 19–21.

Group A

Group B

Group C

Group D

Championship round

Bracket
The draw for the Championship Round was made on November 1, 2010. In the quarterfinals, the group winners were assured of playing the second leg at home, and were drawn against the group runners-up, with the only restriction being that they could not face the same team that it played in the Group Stage (and thus they may face a team from the same association).

Quarterfinals
The first legs of the Quarterfinals were played February 22–24, 2011, and the second legs were played March 1–3, 2011.

|}

Semifinals
The first legs of the Semifinals were played March 15–16, 2011, and the second legs were played April 5–6, 2011.

|}

Final

The first leg of the Final was played April 20, 2011, and the second leg was played April 27, 2011.

|}

Top goalscorers

References

External links
 CONCACAF Champions League official website

 
1
CONCACAF Champions League seasons